Abort is the second studio album by the Boston alternative rock band Tribe, released in 1991. Released by Slash Records/Warner Bros. Records, it was the band's major label debut.

Eight of the ten tracks from Here at the Home were re-recorded for Abort. Four tracks were brand new: "Easter Dinner", "Joyride (I Saw the Film)", "Payphone", and "Serenade".

The track "Pinwheels" was also re-recorded for Abort but in the end was not put on the album. It was released as a b-side in the Easter Dinner E.P.

Three singles were released from the album as EPs: "Easter Dinner", "Payphone", and "Joyride (I Saw the Film)". The band shot a video for "Joyride".

Production
The album was produced by Gil Norton and Chris Sheldon. It was recorded and mixed at Blue Jay Recording Studio, in Carlisle, Massachusetts, from January to February 1991. "Here at Home" is about agoraphobia.

Critical reception

The Boston Herald wrote that "the broad new arrangements are engaging improvements on the band's home-grown tapes, though 'Tied' has lost its eerie appeal."

Track listing

Band Line-Up
 Janet LaValley: vocals, rhythm guitar
 Terri Barous: keyboard, backing vocals
 Eric Brosius: lead guitar, backing vocals
 Greg LoPiccolo: bass, backing vocals
 David Penzo: drums, percussion

References

Tribe (band) albums
1991 albums
Warner Records albums
Albums produced by Gil Norton